Michael Pataki (January 16, 1938 – April 15, 2010) was an American actor of stage, film and television.

Early life

Pataki was born in Youngstown, Ohio to Hungarian parents, the youngest of three children. He had an elder brother and an elder sister. He attended the University of Southern California with a double major in political science and drama. His career was launched at a summer stock festival in Edinburgh in 1966 as Jerry in The Zoo Story.

Television career
Pataki had a co-starring role on the 1974–75 groundbreaking ABC-TV series Get Christie Love! playing Officer Pete Gallagher, Christie Love's bumbling but well-meaning sidekick with the dream to one day be a technical advisor on a TV cop show. Despite being the first detective TV series with an African American female lead, the characters of Christie and Pete rarely discussed race and just focused on watching out for each other and getting out of the trouble they often created for themselves. 

Pataki appeared as a guest star in numerous television productions, from the black and white days of Hawaiian Eye, M Squad, The Twilight Zone, Ripcord, Combat! and My Favorite Martian, to early color shows such as The Flying Nun, All in the Family, Mr. Terrific, Garrison's Gorillas, Bonanza, Run for Your Life, Mission: Impossible, Mannix, Batman and Felony Squad. He was also a regular on Paul Sand in Friends and Lovers and The Amazing Spider-Man, and had a re-occurring role on McCloud as well. One of his most famous roles was as "Korax", the brash, loudmouthed Klingon who provoked the bar fight in "The Trouble with Tribbles" episode of Star Trek.

He also played Governor Karnas in the Star Trek: The Next Generation episode "Too Short a Season" and George Liquor in the episodes of The Ren & Stimpy Show entitled "Dog Show" and "Man's Best Friend"; he would continue playing the latter role in subsequent projects by John Kricfalusi up until his death, with his last appearance being in the posthumously released 2019 short Cans Without Labels. Pataki is one of the few Star Trek actors that appeared in both the original series and The Next Generation. In the original series, he played Klingon First Officer Korax in the episode "The Trouble with Tribbles". He was also the voice of The Cow in Mighty Mouse: The New Adventures, along with many other secondary characters. Pataki played a guest spot on Happy Days Season 4 as  Myron "Count" Malachi, one half of the Malachi brothers. He was made famous on Happy Days for his line "Let the pigeons loose." He played a Russian defector in the episode "The Americanization of Ivan" in WKRP in Cincinnati.

Film career
Pataki's film credits included Airport '77 (1977), Spider-Man (1977), Love at First Bite (1979), The Onion Field (1979), Raise the Titanic (1980), Remo Williams: The Adventure Begins (1985), and many others. He also appeared in Rocky IV (1985), as Nicoli Koloff, the sports administrator for the Soviet team and had a memorable moment in Ron Howard's Night Shift as a man who moons an entire courtroom.

Pataki has also had his fair share of B movie roles in titles such as  The Last Porno Flick (1974), Carnal Madness a.k.a. Delinquent Schoolgirls (1975) with George Buck Flower and Colleen Brennan, and others. In Dracula's Dog (1977), he played opposite Reggie Nalder and José Ferrer as a descendant of Dracula who is being stalked by a vampiric Doberman Pinscher. His other horror titles included Grave of the Vampire (1972), The Baby (1973), Dead & Buried (1981) and Halloween 4: The Return of Michael Myers (1988). He also directed Richard Basehart in Mansion of the Doomed (1976).

Other work
Pataki directed the 1977 film version of Cinderella. He also co-produced the filming of the stage presentation of Pippin with David Sheehan, starring William Katt. Pataki was also an accomplished voice over artist, playing the part of the Sewer King in an episode of Batman: The Animated Series. He was the voice of George Liquor for The Ren & Stimpy Show production house Spümcø until the company was fired by Nickelodeon in 1992. He reprised the role for subsequent John Kricfalusi projects in the following years, with the last being the crowdfunded short Cans Without Labels, which was released   in 2019, nine years after his death.

Death
Pataki died from cancer on April 15, 2010 at the age of 72. He completed his recording for George Liquor for Cans Without Labels before his death and the short was dedicated to his memory.

Selected filmography

 The Young Lions (1958) as Pvt. Hagstrom (uncredited)
 Ten North Frederick (1958) as Parking Lot Thug (uncredited)
 Easy Rider (1969) as Mime #4
 The Sidehackers (1969) as J.C.
 The Cut-Throats (1969) as German Sniper (uncredited)
 Dream No Evil (1970) as Rev. Paul Jessie Bundy
 The Andromeda Strain (1971) as Operator of 'The Hands' (uncredited)
 The Return of Count Yorga (1971) as Joe
 Brute Corps (1971) as MacFarlane
 The All American Hustler (1972) as Carol's Boyfriend (uncredited)
 Pink Angels (1972) as Biker
 Grave of the Vampire (1972) as Caleb Croft / Professor Lockwood
 The Dirt Gang (1972) as Snake
 The Black Bunch (1973) as Mr. Heinke 
 The Baby (1973) as Dennis
 Sweet Jesus, Preacherman (1973) as State Senator Sills
 Little Cigars (1973) as Garage Mechanic
 Heterosexualis (1973) as Virgil
 Last Foxtrot in Burbank (1973) as Paul 
 The Bat People (1974) as Sgt. Ward
 The Last Porno Flick (1974) as Ziggy
 Get Christie Love! (1974-75) as Sgt. Pete Gallagher
 Carnal Madness (1975) as Carl C. Clooney
 Airport '77 (1977) as Wilson
 Spider-Man (1977, TV Movie) as Captain Barbera
 Dracula's Dog (1977) as Michael Drake / Count Igor Dracula
 Jailbait Babysitter (1977) as Roger Warfield (uncredited)
 Spider-Man Strikes Back (1978) as Captain Barbera (voice)
 Superdome (1978, TV Movie) as Tony Sicota
 When Every Day Was the Fourth of July (1978, TV Movie) as Robert Najarian
 The Pirate (1978, TV Movie) as General Eshnev
 Love at First Bite (1979) as Mobster
 The Onion Field (1979) as Dist. Atty. Dino Fulgoni
 The Glove (1979) as Harry Iverson
 The Last Word (1979) as Dobbs
 Disaster on the Coastliner (1979, TV Movie) as Tate
 Up Yours (1979) as Virgil / Virgil's Father 
 Raise the Titanic (1980) as Munk
 High Noon, Part II: The Return of Will Kane (1980, TV Movie) as Darold
 Graduation Day (1981) as Principal Guglione
 Dead and Buried (1981) as Sam
 Night Shift (1982) as Man Who Moons Courtroom (uncredited)
 Sweet Sixteen (1983) as George Martin
 One More Chance (1983) as Sam
 Remo Williams: The Adventure Begins (1985) as Jim Wilson
 Rocky IV (1985) as Nicolai Koloff 
 American Anthem (1986) as Coach Soranhoff
 The Underachievers (1987) as Murphy
 Death House (1987) as Franco Moretti
 Halloween 4: The Return of Michael Myers (1988) as Dr. Hoffman
 Hollywood Hot Tubs 2: Educating Crystal (1990) as Professor Drewton
 The Looking Glass (2003) as Frank
 Edge of Nowhere (2003) as Sheriff
 Trim (2010) as Dimitri
 Cans Without Labels (2019) as George Liquor (posthumous release)

References

External links
 
 
 

1938 births
2010 deaths
American male film actors
American male television actors
American male voice actors
American people of Hungarian descent
Deaths from cancer in California
Male actors from Youngstown, Ohio
University of Southern California alumni